Herbrandston is a village, parish and community on the north side of the River Cleddau, in Pembrokeshire, Wales. It is located to the west of Milford Haven and Hakin and east of St Ishmael's. Before 1960 and the building of the ESSO oil refinery, the village only had a population of 200; as infrastructure grew, so did the population. The size of the village increased within a matter of years, as housing estates associated with the refinery were built. The village has a population of 397, 15 per cent of which is Welsh-speaking.

History
Herbrandston's name derives from a Norman or Flemish settler in Pembrokeshire, named Herbrand, who, soon after the Norman Conquest, settled here. It was part of the historical hundred of Roose.

Church
St Mary's church in the village contains a worn effigy of what appears to be a 14th-century knight holding a sword. Its tower has two levels; the third level, which contained battlements, was removed between 1740 and 1770. The village green was the site of an annual Hiring Fair, held on 12 August.

Thankful village
Herbrandston is one of only 14 doubly Thankful Villages in the UK, in that it suffered no fatalities during either World War I or World War II.

References

External links

Milford Haven
Communities in Pembrokeshire
Populated coastal places in Wales
Villages in Pembrokeshire